Willfred Weymouth Lufkin (March 10, 1879 – March 28, 1934) was a United States representative from Massachusetts.

Biography
He was born in Essex on March 10, 1879. He attended public schools. After completing school, Lufkin was a newspaper correspondent and a private secretary to Congressman Augustus P. Gardner. He was a member and chairman of the Essex School Board and a member of the 1917 Massachusetts Constitutional Convention, 1917–1919.

Lufkin married Georgia Story, daughter of Arthur and Margie Story.

1917 Massachusetts Constitutional Convention
In 1916 the Massachusetts legislature and electorate approved a calling of a Constitutional Convention. In  May 1917, Lufkin was elected to serve as a member of the Massachusetts Constitutional Convention of 1917, representing Massachusetts' 6th Congressional District.

Election to Congress
Lufkin was elected as a Republican to the Sixty-fifth Congress to fill the vacancy caused by the resignation of Congressman Augustus P. Gardner.

Lufkin was reelected to the Sixty-sixth and Sixty-seventh Congresses and served from November 6, 1917 to June 30, 1921. He resigned to become Collector of Customs for the Port of Boston on July 1, 1921 and served until his retirement in 1933. He was again elected a member of the Essex School Board and served as Town Moderator of the town meeting in 1925.

Lufkin died in Essex on March 28, 1934. His interment was in Essex Cemetery.

References

Bibliography
Journal of the Constitutional Convention of the Commonwealth of Massachusetts  (1919).
Municipal History of Essex County in Massachusetts p. 324 (1922).

External links

1879 births
1934 deaths
Members of the 1917 Massachusetts Constitutional Convention
Republican Party members of the United States House of Representatives from Massachusetts
Collectors of the Port of Boston
School board members in Massachusetts